is a railway station located in the city of Kitaakita, Akita Prefecture, Japan, operated by the third sector railway operator Akita Nairiku Jūkan Railway.

Lines
Maeda-Minami Station is served by the Nariku Line, and is located 21.1 km from the terminus of the line at Takanosu Station.

Station layout
The station consists of one side platform serving a single bi-directional track. The station is unattended.

Adjacent stations

History

Maeda-Minami Station opened on October 15 1963 as a station on the Japan National Railways (JNR) serving the town of Moriyoshi, Akita. The line was privatized on November 1, 1986, becoming the Akita Nairiku Jūkan Railway.

In 2016 the success of the animated film Your Name brought many visitors to Maeda-Minami Station, since fans noticed the close similarity of the station with a station illustrated in the film. In response, the Akita Nairiku Jūkan Railway ran an express train service that stops at Maeda-Minami from October 7 to November 6.

Surrounding area
 
Ani River

References

External links

 Nairiku Railway Station information 

Railway stations in Japan opened in 1963
Railway stations in Akita Prefecture
Kitaakita